Iksha is an urban locality (a work settlement) in Dmitrovsky District of Moscow Oblast, Russia, located  north of Moscow along the Dmitrov highway and the Moscow Canal, and is a junction of the Savyolovo Railway. Population: 

The settlement was founded during the construction of the railroad from Moscow to Dmitrov in 1889. It further developed due to the construction of the Moscow Canal in the 1930s. The main point of interest is a cascade of Moscow Canal locks on the Iksha Reservoir built in Socialist Classicism style.

References

External links
Official website of Iksha

Urban-type settlements in Moscow Oblast
Populated places in Dmitrovsky District, Moscow Oblast